Parie is a 2012 Kannada-language romance film starring Rakesh Adiga and Nivedhitha. The film is directed by Sudhir Attavar. Veer Samarth is the music director of the film. In total, there are seven producers for this movie which makes it special. The other highlight of the movie is Veterans M. S. Sathyu and Nimay Ghosh were hired for art direction and cinematography respectively. The film made its theatrical release on 27 April 2012.

Cast 
 Rakesh Adiga as Bharadhwaj
 Nivedhitha as Parie
 Usha Uthup
 Naga Kiran as Chandru
 Harshika Poonacha as Sumedha
 Vikram Udayakumar
 Sharath Lohitashwa
 Srinivas Prabhu
 Hemangini Ka as in a cameo appearance

Soundtrack

Release

Premier 
The film, for the first time in the Kannada film industry, had a special pre-release premiere show held in Mumbai on 15 April 2012. Arranged and hosted by M. S. Sathyu and the director Sudhir Attavar, the venue was at Cinemax Multiplex in Andheri.

Reception

Critical response 

A critic from The Times of India scored the film at 3 out of 5 stars and says "While Rakesh tops the list with a brilliant performance, Nivedita is lively as the girl next door. Harshika, though impressive, doesn’t fit into the role. Nagakiran, Satya and Srinivas Prabhu have done justice. Music by Veera Samarth has some catchy tunes, especially the number ‘Mugilina maatu…’ Cinematography by Anant Urs is average". A critic from News18 India wrote "For the mood of the film Ananth Urs camera whirrs to showcase the developments. The costumes for this film are pretty good. Sudhir Attavar should attempt make films to save the producer". Srikanth Srinivasa from Rediff.com scored the film at 2 out of 5 stars and wrote "Harshika Poonacha looks very glamorous but too young for the role, though she has acquitted herself commendably. Nagkiran doesn't have much of a role. Srinivasa Prabhu shines as Parie's father. Parie is disappointing and a let-down". S Viswanath from Deccan Herald wrote "Despite its lofty claims and call for cine buffs to celebrate cinema in its 100 year as also its even more shrill salespitch that erstwhile Puttana Kanagal’s dreams is being realised with Parie it’s best to shun it with the bargepole. Sad!".

References

2012 films
2010s Kannada-language films